Bosnia and Herzegovina participated in the Eurovision Song Contest 1996 in Oslo, Norway. Amila Glamočak represented Bosnia and Herzegovina with the song "Za našu ljubav". They finished on 22nd place out of 23 countries with 13 points. It was the worst result for Bosnia and Herzegovina until .

Before Eurovision

BH Eurosong 1996 
The final was held on 7 March 1996 at Bosnian TV Studios in Sarajevo and was hosted by Segmedina Srna who should be a spokesperson in the Eurovision Song Contest 1996. All of the songs were sung by Amila Glamočak and the winner was chosen by an "expert" jury.

At Eurovision
In 1996, for the only time in Eurovision history, an audio-only qualifying round of the 29 songs entered (excluding hosts Norway who were exempt) was held in March in order for the seven lowest-scoring songs to be eliminated before the final. "Za našu ljubav" placed 21st with 29 points, thus qualifying for the final.

On the night of the final Amila Glamočak performed 21st in the running order, following Poland and preceding Slovakia. At the end of the voting, Bosnia and Herzegovina received 13 points (highest being 6 from Turkey) placing 22nd out of 23 entries, ahead of only Finland. It would be the worst result for Bosnia and Herzegovina until 2016.

The Bosnian jury awarded its 12 points to contest winners Ireland.

Voting

Qualifying round

Final

References

1996
Countries in the Eurovision Song Contest 1996
Eurovision